The Men's Basketball tournament at the 2019 Military World Games was held in Wuhan, China from 19 to 26 October.

Preliminary round

Group A

Group B

Classification round

9th-10th place

7th-8th place

5th-6th place

Final round

Semi-finals

Bronze-medal match

Gold-medal match

Final standing

External links

Basketball Men
2019 men